Aquí está Felipe Reyes is a Mexican telenovela produced by Valentín Pimstein for Televisión Independiente de México in 1972.

Cast 
Antonio Medellín
Blanca Sánchez
Alicia Rodríguez
Virginia Gutiérrez
Raúl Meraz
Arturo Benavides
Sergio Bustamante
Claudio Obregón
Roberto Araya
Guillermo Zarur
Jorge Mateos
Justo Martínez
Héctor Martínez Serrano

References

External links 

Mexican telenovelas
1972 telenovelas
Televisa telenovelas
Spanish-language telenovelas
1972 Mexican television series debuts
1972 Mexican television series endings